Crataegus aemula, the Rome hawthorn,  is a species of hawthorn that is common in some parts of Mississippi and Georgia, and also occurs in Alabama. It is a perennial shrub or tree. Its habitats include oak flatwoods and brush.

References

External links
Floyd-flora.info:  " Crataegus aemula (Rome Hawthorn) in Floyd County, Northwest Georgia, U.S."

aemula
Endemic flora of the United States
Flora of Alabama
Flora of Mississippi
Flora of Georgia (U.S. state)
Flora without expected TNC conservation status